Jacob Timpano (born 3 January 1986) in Wollongong, Australia) is a former Australian footballer and current head coach of Wollongong  Wolves in the National Premier Leagues NSW.

Club career
Timpano previously played for the Wollongong Wolves in the National Soccer League. He is a central defender, and has represented Australia at the 2005 FIFA World Youth Championship and captained Australia in the 2003 FIFA U-17 World Championship as an Under-20 and Under-17 respectively.

In the 2005-06 A-League season, Timpano was an essential part of Sydney FC championship-winning side - playing in 19 of the club's 24 games.
However, in the 2006-07 A-League season, Timpano made only 2 appearances (1 start) due to persistent leg injuries which continued into the start of season 2007/08.  By the time Timpano recovered full fitness he found himself out of favour with the new coach only playing another 3 games for Sydney before he left the club.

In 2009, Timpano signed a two-year deal to be part of the new North Queensland Fury's inaugural A-League squad alongside current Sydney FC teammates, Robbie Middleby, Brendon Šantalab and Beau Busch.  However, he once again found himself the 4th choice defensive option and remained unused throughout the season, much of which he spent on loan at Queensland League club North Queensland Razorbacks.

At the end of the season, Jacob was one of the players controversially released by the club despite being under contract.  After being released, Jacob went back to New South Wales to play for Sydney United in the NSW Premier League.

He signed for South Coast Wolves after transferring from Sydney United ahead of the 2011 NSW Premier League season.

Timpano left South Coast Wolves, signing for Dapto Dandaloo Fury ahead of their 2015 Illawarra Premier League campaign. He was announced as one of six new signings for the club. He will play with several former A-League players, including Noel Spencer, Alvin Ceccoli, Shane Lyons, and Wade Oostendorp.

International career
During 2006, Timpano was selected and captained the Australian Under 23's national football team in their campaign for the 2008 Summer Olympics, and played in all three international matches that year against Iran, Vietnam and Uzbekistan.

Managerial career
Timpano was appointed manager of his former New South Wales NPL club Wollongong  Wolves following the resignation of Nahuel Arrarte, midway through the 2015 NSW NPL season.

Career statistics

Club 

Notes

Honours 
With Sydney FC:
  A-League Championship: 2005-2006
 Oceania Club Championship: 2004-2005

Trivia 
Jacob appeared as an Undercover Coach on Australian Disney Channel.

References

External links
 North Queensland Fury profile
 Oz Football profile

1986 births
Living people
Sportspeople from Wollongong
Australian people of Italian descent
Australian soccer players
Northern Fury FC players
Sydney FC players
New South Wales Institute of Sport alumni
National Premier Leagues players
Wollongong Wolves FC players
Association football defenders